Petar Angelov Shishkov (8 April 1924 – 8 September 2008) was a Bulgarian basketball player. He competed in the men's tournament at the 1952 Summer Olympics.

References

External links

1924 births
2008 deaths
Bulgarian men's basketball players
Olympic basketball players of Bulgaria
Basketball players at the 1952 Summer Olympics
People from Panagyurishte